Salkay Island, or Salkay Aryta, is an island in the Laptev Sea. The name of this island can be also spelt as "Salkhay" and "Salkyy".

Only  to the north there is another island, Orto Ary.
Daldalakh is an island immediately north of Orto-Ary which is almost attached to the mainland, separated from it by a very narrow canal on its northwestern side.

The area where these islands lie is subject to severe Arctic weather with frequent gales and blizzards. The sea around these islands is frozen for about nine months every year so that they all are merged with the mainland most of the time.

References

Islands of the Laptev Sea
Islands of the Sakha Republic